Chorakku Chora is a 1985 Indian Malayalam film,  directed by Crossbelt Mani. The film stars Jagathy Sreekumar, Ratheesh, Balan K. Nair and Kuthiravattam Pappu in the lead roles. The film has musical score by Guna Singh.

Cast
Jagathy Sreekumar as Kunjappan
Ratheesh as Khader
Balan K. Nair as Chellappan
Kuthiravattam Pappu as Velu
Silk Smitha as CID Silk
Prathapachandran as Rahman
Ravi Menon as Paulose
Kaduvakulam Antony as Paramu
Hari as SP Subramaniyam  
Sathaar as Markose
Sudheer as Veerappan
Anuradha as Chandrika
Lalithasree as Thankamma
Roshni as Nabeesha
Mafia Sasi as Gunda
Muralimohan as DSP Aloshys

Soundtrack
The music was composed by Guna Singh and the lyrics were written by Poovachal Khader.

References

External links
 

1985 films
1980s Malayalam-language films
Films directed by Crossbelt Mani